Smoke and Fire may refer to:

 "Smoke and Fire" (Sabrina Carpenter song), a 2016 single by Sabrina Carpenter
 "Smoke and Fire", a song by Screaming Lord Sutch from his 1969 album Lord Sutch and Heavy Friends

See also
 "Fire and Smoke", a 1981 song by Earl Thomas Conley, and the album it was released from
 Smoke or Fire, an American punk band